Mandriva Directory Server (MDS) is an LDAP server developed by Mandriva. This is similar to 389 Directory Server, Novell eDirectory etc. for managing resources & infrastructure within the network.

See also

 Fedora Directory Server
 Novell eDirectory
 List of LDAP software

External links
Mandriva Directory Server

Directory services